James Picken may refer to:

James Picken (footballer), English footballer
James Thomson Picken, better known as J. T. Picken, Scottish-Australian businessman

See also
James Pickens Jr. (born 1954), American actor